The Federação Mineira de Futebol (English: Football Association of Minas Gerais state) is the entity that controls football practice in the state of Minas Gerais, and represents the clubs at the Brazilian Football Confederation (CBF). It organizes the Campeonato Mineiro, the Campeonato Mineiro Módulo II and the Campeonato Mineiro Segunda Divisão.

Current clubs in Brasileirão 
As of 2022 season. Common team names are noted in bold.

References

Mineira
 
Sports organizations established in 1915
1915 establishments in Brazil